On 30 January 2016, at least 86 people were killed and at least 62 more injured in an attack by Boko Haram militants on Dalori Village 4 kilometers from Maiduguri, Nigeria. The attack was a reprisal against the Civilian Joint Task Force, and it began when militants in two cars and on motorcycles entered Dalori and began to shoot at residents and firebomb their huts. One estimate is that perhaps more than 100 militants were involved in the attack. The attack lasted for about four hours, and the militants allegedly burnt children alive.

The Nigerian Army was unable to fight the militants until reinforcements arrived, causing Boko Haram to retreat. Fleeing villagers were hunted down by the insurgents, and three female suicide bombers blew themselves up among people who had escaped to the neighbouring village of Gamori.

The exact death toll is not known, but at least 86 people are confirmed to have been killed. 62 others were treated for burns at the State Specialist Hospital in Maiduguri. Large parts of Dalori village were destroyed in the attack.

Questions have been raised over how the militants were able to attack a settlement so close to army headquarters in Maiduguri, how they apparently drove unhindered past roads patrolled by soldiers and vigilantes, and how they were able to attack the village for several hours before the army intervened and drove them out.

See also
 List of terrorist incidents, January–June 2016
 List of terrorist incidents linked to ISIL

References

2016 murders in Nigeria
Suicide bombings in Nigeria
Arson in Africa
2010s massacres in Nigeria
Mass murder in 2016
Terrorist incidents in Nigeria in 2016
Massacres perpetrated by Boko Haram
Islamic State of Iraq and the Levant in Nigeria
January 2016 events in Africa